Celebration is a compilation album by Swiss singer DJ BoBo, released in 2002.

Track listing

 Celebration
 Somebody Dance With Me 2002
 Everybody (feat. Emilia)
 Tell Me Why (feat. Gölä)
 Where Is Your Love (feat. No Angels)
 Pray 2002
 Love of My Life (feat. Melanie Thornton)
 Together (feat. ATC)
 There Is a Party 2002
 Freedom 2002
 Love Is the Price (Spanglish Version)
 Respect Yourself 2002
 What a Feeling (feat. Irene Cara)
 It's My Life
 Lonely 4 You (feat. Tone)
 Let the Dream Come True 2002
 Around the World
 Wonderful Day
 Shadows of the Night (feat. Vienna Symphonic Orchestra Project)

Bonus disc 

 Colors of Life (Pure Mix)
 Take Control (New Version)
 Radio Ga Ga
 Celebrate (Latin Version)
 Come Take My Hand (The New Atlantis Version)
 Love Is All Around (UK Radio Version)
 Lies (Video Version)
 Keep On Dancing (New Version)
 I'll Be There (Single Version from Spain)
 Hard to Say I'm Sorry (Video Version)
 Nightfly
 B&B Megamix
 Bonus Multimedia Track

Charts

Weekly charts

Year-end charts

References

External links
www.discogs.com
www.shop.djbobo.ch

2002 compilation albums
DJ BoBo albums
Eurodance compilation albums